Football Club Mantois 78 are a French football club that was founded in 1994. The club is based in Mantes-la-Ville in the suburbs of Paris and is of the Yvelines department. The club's relatively late foundation is due to a merger between three other clubs from the region. The club is often referred to as FC Mantes due to their location, however, their common name is FC Mantois with Mantois being the natural region of the area the club inhabits.

History
The club's parent club before their foundation was Athletic Club de Mantes-la-Ville, who reached the CFA in 1968 and ultimately reached as far as Division 2, where they remained for four years before plunging down to the sixth division of French football. In 1994, the club merged with two other local clubs, Association sportive de Mantes and Association sportive de Buchelay to form the club that exists today. After a decade at the fourth level of French football, the club was relegated to Championnat National 3 in 2020 after being positioned bottom of 2019–20 Championnat National 2 Group B when the season was curtailed due to the COVID-19 pandemic. They were relegated again in 2021–22, to the sixth tier, having twice being deducted points during the season.

Current squad

References

External links
Official club website 

Mant
Association football clubs established in 1994
1994 establishments in France
Mant
Mant